is a city located in Hyōgo Prefecture, Japan. , the city had an estimated population of 22,177 in 9236 households and a population density of 52 persons per km².

Geography 
Yabu is located in the northern part of Hyōgo Prefecture and the Kinki region.The Maruyama River flows from the southeast to the northeast in the eastern part of the city, and the Yoka and Sekinomiya neighborhoods are located along the Yagi River, which is a tributary of the Maruyama River, and the Yabu and Oya areas are located along the Oya River. Part of the city is within the borders of the Hyōnosen-Ushiroyama-Nagisan Quasi-National Park, including Mount Myōken (1139 meters), and Mount Hyōno the city's highest elevation at 1510 meters.

Neighbouring municipalities 
Hyōgo Prefecture
 Asago
 Kami
 Shisō
 Toyooka
Tottori Prefecture
 Wakasa

Climate
Yabu has a Humid subtropical climate (Köppen Cfa) characterized by warm summers and cool winters with heavy snowfall. The average annual temperature in Yabu is 12.6 °C. The average annual rainfall is 1936 mm with September as the wettest month. The temperatures are highest on average in August, at around 24.2 °C, and lowest in January, at around 0.3 °C.

Demographics
Per Japanese census data, the population of Yabu has declined steadily over the half century.

History
The area of the modern town of Yabu was within ancient Tajima Province.In the Edo Period, it was mostly tenryō territory under direct administration of the Tokugawa shogunate, with a small portion under the control of Izushi Domain. Following the Meiji restoration, it was initially part of "Toyooka Domain" before merging with Hyōgo Prefecture in 1876. The village of Hirotani and Takinoya created within Yabu District, Hyōgo with the creation of the modern municipalities system on April 1, 1889. Hirotani was raised to town status on April 15, 1927 and merged with Takinoya to form the town of Myōjin on September 1, 1956. Myōjin changed it name to Yabu on March 31,1957. On April 1, 2004, Yabu, merged with the towns of Oya, Sekinomiya and Yoka (all from Yabu District) to form the city of Yabu.

Government
Yabu has a mayor-council form of government with a directly elected mayor and a unicameral city council of 16 members. Yabu, together with the city of Asago contributes one member to the Hyogo Prefectural Assembly. In terms of national politics, the city is part of Hyōgo 5th district of the lower house of the Diet of Japan.

Economy
Yabu has a economy based primarily on agriculture, and is known for its production of garlic and "Tajima beef".

Education
Yabu has eight public elementary schools and three public middle schools operated by the city government and two public high schools operated by the Hyōgo Prefectural Department of Education. There is also one private high school.

Transportation

Railway
 JR West – San'in Main Line
   -

Highway

Local attractions
Yagi Castle ruins, National Historic Site
Miidani Kofun Cluster, National Historic Site

References

External links

 Yabu official website 

Cities in Hyōgo Prefecture
Yabu, Hyōgo